Taichung Intercontinental Baseball Stadium is a stadium in Beitun District, Taichung, Taiwan. The stadium officially opened on November 9, 2006, replacing the antiquated Taichung Baseball Field. Located on the corner of Chongde Road (崇德路) and Huanzhong Road (環中路), it has considerably more parking available than the old stadium.

The stadium is a venue for rock concerts and also hosted Zhang Yimou's Turandot at the Bird's Nest in 2010.

Construction
Construction on the stadium began in 2005 and is operating on the Build-Operate-Transfer (BOT) model that is becoming increasingly common among public works projects in Taiwan. The first phase includes 15,000 infield seats, all with seatback chairs. After the second phase was completed in 2008, seating capacity was expanded to 20,000 by adding 5,000 outfield seats.

Major events
The first major event hosted by the new stadium was the 2006 Intercontinental Cup, a baseball competition between eight nations from four different continents. South Korea defeated the Philippines in the opener 10–0, followed by Chinese Taipei's defeat against Italy 3–13 on November 9.

On the final day of the 2006 Intercontinental Cup it was announced that the 2007 Baseball World Cup will be held in Taichung, with this stadium one of the two to be used for the tournament. The stadium also hosted some games at the 2007 Asian Baseball Championship, which counted as the 2008 Summer Olympics qualifier for the Asia region.

The stadium hosted Pool B in the first round of the 2013 World Baseball Classic.

The stadium hosted Group A and Quarterfinals of the 2015 WBSC Premier12.

The ballpark has hosted a number of games of the Asia Winter Baseball League, most recently in November/December 2018

The stadium hosted Pool B in the first round of the 2019 WBSC Premier12.

The stadium hosted Pool A in the first round of the 2023 World Baseball Classic.

World Baseball City
Due to the success of 2006 Intercontinental Cup, Taichung City Government and Chinese Taipei Baseball Association start striving to hold various of international events in following years. The stadium had hosted 10 International Baseball Federation (IBAF) events in first 10 years since the stadium had established.

IBAF awarded the World Baseball City medal during the opening ceremony of 2013 18U Baseball World Cup in order to appreciate the contribution that Taichung City Government had done. Taichung City became the first city to be awarded by IBAF. The World Baseball City stele was also erected at the stadium entrance.

Name confusion
From the beginning of this project, the stadium had been known as the Taichung International Standard Baseball Stadium.  However, newspaper reports had referred to it as the Taichung International Baseball Stadium, (dropping the word "Standard".)  A Chinese language schedule for the 2006 Intercontinental Cup had identified the stadium as the Taichung Intercontinental Stadium.

According to a report in 2006, the mayor of Taichung, Jason Hu, announced that the name of the stadium has been officially designated as Intercontinental Baseball Stadium. This is in honor of the event being the first to be held at the stadium.

Miscellaneous

Stadium firsts

First competitive game:  South Korea vs. Philippines; November 9, 2006, as part of the 2006 Intercontinental Cup.
First win:  South Korea 10 – Philippines 0; November 9, 2006, 2006 Intercontinental Cup
First mercy rule win: South Korea 10 – Philippines 0; November 9, 2006; 2006 Intercontinental Cup
First nine-inning shutout:
First extra-inning game: Chinese Taipei vs. South Korea; November 12, 2006; 2006 Intercontinental Cup
First home run: Bradley Harman (Australia) (8th inning vs. Philippines);  November 10, 2006; 2006 Intercontinental Cup
First grand slam: Chen Yung-Chi (Chinese Taipei) (7th inning vs. South Korea); November 12, 2006; 2006 Intercontinental Cup
First complete game:

Stadium records
Longest game: 13 innings – Italy vs. Australia; November 12, 2006; 2006 Intercontinental Cup 
Runs in a game (Single Team):  13 – Italy vs. Chinese Taipei;  November 9, 2006; Netherlands v. South Korea, November 15, 2006  2006 Intercontinental Cup
Runs in a game (Combined): 16 – Italy (13) vs. Chinese Taipei (3) ; November 9, 2006: and Chinese Taipei (9) v. South Korea  (7); September 12, 2006 ;  2006 Intercontinental Cup
Runs in an inning (Single Team): 6 – Italy (3rd inning) vs. Chinese Taipei, November 9, 2006;  Australia (8th inning) v. the Philippines,  November 10, 2006 ; 2006 Intercontinental Cup
Runs in an inning (Combined):  6 – Italy vs. Chinese Taipei (3rd inning), November 9, 2006 ;   Australia v. the Philippines (8th inning), November 10, 2006 ; 2006 Intercontinental Cup
Runs in a game (Single Player): 2 – Numerous times
RBIs in a game (Single Player): 7 – Jack Murphy, ABL Canberra Cavalry vs. Uni-President 7-Eleven Lions; 20 November 2013; 2013 Asia Series final (won 14–4 with Murphy hitting a Grand Slam Home run in the 8th inning)
Hits in a game (Single Team): 19 - Italy vs. Chinese Taipei;  November 9, 2006; 2006 Intercontinental Cup
Hits in a game (Combined): 29 – Italy (19) vs. Chinese Taipei (10); November 9, 2006 ; Australia (10) v. South Korea (9)  November 14, 2006  - 2006 Intercontinental Cup
Hits in a game (Single Player): 3 – Numerous times
Strikeouts in a game (Pitching Staff): 12 – Cuba vs. Netherlands; November 19, 2006  2006 Intercontinental Cup
Strikeouts in a game (Single Pitcher): 8 – Frank Montieh (Cuba) vs. Netherlands; November 19, 2006 ; 2006 Intercontinental Cup

Notes

See also
 List of stadiums in Taiwan
 Sport in Taiwan
 Taichung Baseball Field
 Chinatrust Brothers

References 

 洲際盃: 11月台中開打 (Intercontinental Cup:  Begins in November in Taichung.) 自由時報 (Liberty Times.)  October 5, 2006.  Page A10
 Development map published by the Taichung Municipal Government in October, 2005.

External links

  Webpage on stadium from Taichung City Government's website

Baseball venues in Taiwan
Buildings and structures in Taichung
Sport in Taichung
Sports venues completed in 2006
2006 establishments in Taiwan
World Baseball Classic venues